Lewis John Cook (born 3 February 1997) is an English professional footballer who plays as a central midfielder for  club AFC Bournemouth, and formerly for the England national team.

Cook is a graduate of Leeds United's academy. He has represented England at various youth levels. He has won the 2014 UEFA European Under-17 Championship, 2017 FIFA U-20 World Cup and 2018 Toulon Tournament with his country, captaining the team in the latter two tournaments.

Early life
Cook was born in York, North Yorkshire. He attended Tadcaster Grammar School, playing for their football teams from under-13 to under-15 level.

Club career

Leeds United

Early career
Cook graduated through the Leeds United Academy and was playing for the under-18s team when he was just 15 years old. Cook scored in a 3–1 loss against Liverpool under-18s on 1 March 2013 at Anfield for Leeds under-18s in the FA Youth Cup.

2014–15 season
After breaking into the team during the 2014–15 pre-season, Cook made his first-team debut for Leeds United in the first match of the season, coming on as a 64th-minute substitute against Millwall. He made his first start for Leeds on 12 August 2014, starting the League Cup match against Accrington Stanley. He made his first league start on 30 August against Watford. Cook became one of the first names on the teamsheet for Leeds, becoming part of a homegrown contingent in the first team alongside Sam Byram, Alex Mowatt and Charlie Taylor. On 28 March 2015, he picked up an ankle injury on international duty, which ruled him out of the final matches of the season.

On 9 April 2015, after rumoured Premier League interest in Cook and teammates Sam Byram, Alex Mowatt and Charlie Taylor, head coach Neil Redfearn challenged Leeds United's owners to keep a hold of their home-grown talents. On 19 April, Cook won the Championship Apprentice of the Year award for the 2014–15 season. On 1 May 2015, Cook was named as the runner-up to winner Alex Mowatt for the Yorkshire Evening Post Player of the Year for the 2014–15 season. On 2 May 2015, he won Leeds' Young Player of the Year Award and also finished as runner-up to Alex Mowatt in the Fans' Player of the Year Award at the club's official end of season awards ceremony.

2015–16 season
Cook signed a new contract at Leeds on 11 May 2015, tying him to the club until June 2017. On 12 August 2015, he scored his first Leeds goal against Doncaster Rovers in the League Cup, but was also sent off in the first half for a straight red card, with Leeds eventually losing 4–2 on penalties after a 1–1 draw. As a result of this red card, Cook received a three-match suspension. After being subject to bids from Premier League clubs, Leeds manager Steve Evans revealed on 7 January 2016 that they had rejected bids for Cook and that club owner Massimo Cellino had assured him that the player would not be sold. On 24 February 2016, Cook scored with a 35-yard short to earn his first league goal for Leeds in a 1–1 home draw against Fulham.

On 17 April 2016, Cook won the Football League Young Player of the Year Award. At the club's annual Player of the Year Awards ceremony on 30 April 2016, Cook missed out on Player of the Year to Charlie Taylor, but was named the Young Player of the Year for the 2015–16 season. In addition to this, he was presented with the award for Goal of the Season for his goal against Fulham. On 15 June 2016, Leeds owner Massimo Cellino stated he had entered into talks with Cook's agent about extending the player's contract.

AFC Bournemouth
On 8 July 2016, Cook signed for Premier League club AFC Bournemouth on a four-year contract for an undisclosed fee. He made his debut when starting in a 3–1 defeat at home to Manchester United in their first match of the 2016–17 Premier League. Cook made two further appearances in the League Cup before being sidelined until 2017 by a persistent ankle problem. Cook returned to the first team on 15 April 2017, coming on as a 56th-minute substitute in a 4–0 away defeat to Tottenham Hotspur. He scored his first goal for Bournemouth in a 4-2 win against Reading on 21 November 2020.

International career
In May 2014, Cook was part of the England national under-17 team that won the 2014 UEFA European Under-17 Championship, starting three of England's five matches, including the semi-final and the final. In August 2014, he was called up to the under-18 team for a match against the Netherlands.

In March 2015, Cook was called up to Sean O'Driscoll's under-19 team to play Denmark, Azerbaijan and France in the last three remaining European Under-19 Championship qualifiers. He made his debut on 28 March, playing 79 minutes against Azerbaijan in a 1–0 win for England before being replaced by Charlie Colkett. Cook had to withdraw from the squad having suffered an ankle injury against Azerbaijan, meaning he missed the match against France as the team looked to secure a place at the tournament in Greece. He was withdrawn from the squad for the 2016 UEFA European Under-19 Championship by his club manager Garry Monk, who wished to work with the player for a full pre-season.

Cook was selected for the under-20 team for the 2017 FIFA U-20 World Cup and was made captain. He played in six of the seven England matches in the tournament, only being rested for the match against South Korea. He scored a goal in a 1–1 draw against Guinea, his first goal in an international match. England beat Venezuela 1–0 in the final, which was England's first win in a global tournament since their 1966 FIFA World Cup victory, and Cook became the first England captain to lift a world trophy since Bobby Moore.

Cook was called up by the senior team for the first time in November 2017 for a friendly against Brazil. He was again named in the England squad in March 2018 for pre 2018 FIFA World Cup friendlies against the Netherlands and Italy. He made his debut against the latter on 27 March as a 71st-minute substitute in the 1–1 draw at Wembley Stadium.

On 16 May 2018, he was one of five players named on standby for the 23-man England national team squad for the 2018 FIFA World Cup.

Cook received a call up to England U21s by manager Aidy Boothroyd on 18 May 2018, with Cook as Captain for the 2018 Toulon Tournament, with England's group containing fixtures against Qatar, China and Mexico. Cook started in the 2018 Toulon Tournament Final against Mexico on 9 June 2018, captaining England to victory in the tournament with a 2–1 win.

Career statistics

Club

International

Honours
AFC Bournemouth
Championship runner-up: 2021–22

England U17
UEFA European Under-17 Championship: 2014

England U20
FIFA U-20 World Cup: 2017

England U21
Toulon Tournament: 2018

Individual
Football League Championship Apprentice of the Year: 2014–15
Leeds United Young Player of the Year: 2014–15, 2015–16
Football League Young Player of the Year: 2015–16
Toulon Tournament Silver Ball: 2018
Toulon Tournament Best XI: 2018

References

External links

Profile at the AFC Bournemouth website

1997 births
Living people
Footballers from York
English footballers
England youth international footballers
England under-21 international footballers
England international footballers
Association football midfielders
Leeds United F.C. players
AFC Bournemouth players
English Football League players
Premier League players